was a town located in Kani District, Gifu Prefecture, Japan.

As of 2003, the town had an estimated population of 1,695 and a density of 649.43 persons per km². The total area was 2.61 km² (which was the smallest municipality of the country in terms of area before the merger took place).

On May 1, 2005, Kaneyama was merged into the expanded city of Kani.

Notes

External links
Kani official website 

Dissolved municipalities of Gifu Prefecture
Kani, Gifu